The VIA Rail Canada Police Service (VRCPS) ( (SPVRC)) is the federal railway police service of the Canadian intercity passenger rail operator, VIA Rail Canada Inc.. 

The agency was formed in 2015 under the Railway Safety Act with Peter Lambrinakos becoming VIA Rail Canada’s first chief of police and chief of corporate security. As a railway police service, the agency is under the purview of the Department of Transport Canada.

Authority

As indicated under Canada's federal Railway Safety Act, VIA Rail police constables are appointed by a judge of a superior court for the enforcement of the laws of Canada or a province in so far as their enforcement relates to the protection of property owned, possessed or administered by VIA Rail Canada and for the protection of persons and property on their property.

VIA Rail Canada is mandated to operate intercity, regional and transcontinental trains linking over 400 communities across Canada. The police constables have jurisdiction on property under the administration of VIA Rail Canada and in any place within 500 metres of property that VIA Rail Canada owns, possesses or administers.

Operations 
The VIA Rail Police deploy at VIA Rail passenger train stations, along the right-of-ways on which VIA Rail trains operate, and on board VIA Rail trains to prevent security incidents and to exercise response and counterterrorism capabilities including events such as the 2013 Via Rail Canada terrorism plot. VIA Rail Police work closely with the other two federal railway police services, the CN Police and CP Police, as well as many local police services of jurisdiction throughout the country to respond and investigate both provincial and federal crimes, as well as undertake a collaborative approach with various law enforcement and community partners to educate the general public on topics related to rail safety in an effort to reduce track-level incidents.

VIA Rail Canada Terror Plot 
On March 20, 2015, Chiheb Esseghaier and Raed Jaser were sentenced to life in prison for conspiring to commit murder for a terrorist group following a conspiracy to derail a train route operated by Amtrak and VIA Rail Canada, known as the Maple Leaf, running between Toronto and New York City.

Canine Unit 
The VIA Rail Police has its own canine unit and deploys vapor wake dogs to alert their human police canine handlers to the presence of threats. The police dogs can quickly screen large crowds and they can follow the trail of a scent.

See also
Railroad police
Transport Canada
Law enforcement in Canada
List of law enforcement agencies in Canada

References

External links

Via Rail
2014 establishments in Canada
Law enforcement agencies of Canada
Organizations established in 2014
Railroad police agencies
Organizations based in Montreal